The Social Research Association (SRA) is a British and Irish organisation open to practitioners and researchers interested in all branches of social research. It was founded in 1978 by Janet Lewis and Malcolm Cross, and supported by an active board that included Roger Jowell.

It is a learned society member of the UK Academy of Social Sciences. In addition to the umbrella organisation, it has branches that cater specifically to researchers in Scotland, Wales and Ireland (including both the Republic of Ireland and Northern Ireland). Among other activities, it publishes a code of conduct for social researchers which is widely adopted as a standard of research ethics by funding agencies in the social sciences.

References

External links
SRA official website

Social sciences organizations
Social research
Learned societies of the United Kingdom
Learned societies of Ireland
1978 establishments in the United Kingdom
1978 establishments in Ireland
Organizations established in 1978